KS X 1002 (formerly KS C 5657) is a South Korean character set standard that is established in order to supplement KS X 1001. It consists of a total of 7,649 characters.

Unlike KS X 1001, KS X 1002 is not encoded in any legacy encoding. Even in 1994, it was known as "a standard that no one implemented."

Characters 
Characters in KS X 1002 are arranged in a 94×94 grid (as in ISO/IEC 2022), and the two-byte code point of each character is expressed in the haeng-yeol form, which specifies a row (haeng 행) and the position of the character within the row (cell, yeol 열).

The rows (numbered from 1 to 94) contain characters as follows:
 01–07: Latin letters with diacritics (613 characters)
 08–10: Greek letters with diacritics (273 characters)
 11–13: miscellaneous symbols (275 characters)
 14: compound jamo and hangul syllables without an initial consonant (27 characters)
 16–36: modern hangul syllables (1,930 characters)
 37–54: archaic hangul syllables (1,675 characters)
 55–85: hanja (2,856 characters)
The rows 15 and 86–94 are unassigned.

Impact on Unicode 
KS X 1002 is one of the sources of the CJK Unified Ideographs block in Unicode.

In Unicode 1.1, the characters at U+3D2E–U+44B7 were from rows 16–36 of KS X 1002. However, they were deleted and superseded by the new Hangul Syllables block (U+AC00–U+D7AF) in Unicode 2.0.

See also 
 List of modern Hangul characters in ISO/IEC 2022–compliant national character set standards

References

External links 
 KS X 1002

Encodings of Asian languages
Korean-language computing
Hangul
Standards of South Korea